John Beattie may refer to:

 John Watt Beattie (1859–1930), Australian photographer and fellow of the Royal Society of Tasmania 
 John Beattie (Australian politician) (born 1932), Tasmanian politician
 John Beattie (musician), Irish musician
 John Beattie (footballer) (1912–1992), Scottish professional association footballer
 John Beattie (rower) (born 1957), who represented Great Britain at the 1980 Summer Olympics
 John Beattie (rugby union) (born 1957), former Scottish international rugby player and commentator
 Johnnie Beattie (born 1985), Scottish international rugby player, son of the above John Beattie
 Johnny Beattie (1927–2020), Scottish actor and comedian
 William John Beattie, known as John Beattie, leader of the Canadian Nazi Party in the 1960s
 John Carruthers Beattie (1866–1946), first principal and Vice Chancellor of the University of Cape Town from 1918 to 1937
 John Maurice Beattie (1932–2017), British legal historian

See also
 John Beatty (disambiguation)
 Jack Beattie (disambiguation)